Carlos Ortega is a Spanish businessman, the former CEO of the Pepe Jeans Group, which also owns Hackett.

Ortega owns more than 20% of the company.

Ortega was mentioned in the Panama Papers.

References

Year of birth missing (living people)
Place of birth missing (living people)
Living people
People named in the Panama Papers
Spanish businesspeople
Spanish chief executives